Andersen Gabrych is an American comic book writer and actor.

Early life
Gabrych grew up in Chico, California. He's been a fan of comics since childhood, having read an issue of Justice League of America at the age of 7. Gabrych was active in drama at Chico Senior High School before graduating in 1991.

Career
As an actor, Gabrych has appeared in Edge of Seventeen, Boys Life 4: Four Play, Gypsy 83, Hit and Runway, Another Gay Movie and its sequel. Off-Broadway, he has appeared in productions at The Public Theater, New York Theatre Workshop, Ensemble Studio Theater, Westbeth Theatre Center and Here!. Gabrych has directed the one-woman show "Tied Up in Knotts" for stand-up comic and SAG/AFTRA actor Karen Knotts, a story of growing up with her comedian father. He performs regularly for the Sit n' Spin reading series held at the Comedy Central Stage.

As a writer, Gabrych has contributed to a number of Batman-related titles for DC Comics and wrote the second volume of Omega Men. He is also a regular contributor and travel writer for LA Confidential Magazine.

Personal life
Gabrych lives in Los Angeles. He is openly gay.

Filmography

Bibliography
To date, the entirety of Gabrych's work has been published by DC Comics:
Batgirl #38: "Testline" (with Jeff Parker, 2003)
Detective Comics (with Pete Woods and Brad Walker (co-features in #795–796), 2004–2005) collected as:
Batman: War Games Book One (includes #790–797, tpb, 464 pages, 2015)
Batman: War Games Book Two (includes #798–800 and 809–810, tpb, 632 pages, 2016)
 Also collects Batman #634 (written by Gabrych, art by Paul Lee, 2005) as part of the "War Games" inter-title crossover.
 Also collects Batman #642 (written by Gabrych, art by Chris Marrinan, 2005) as part of the "War Crimes" inter-title crossover.
Batgirl (with Alé Garza, Pop Mhan, Andy Kuhn (#66) and Francisco Rodriguez de la Fuente (#72), 2005–2006) collected as:
Robin/Batgirl: Fresh Blood (includes #58–59, tpb, 96 pages, 2005)
Kicking Assassins (collects #60–64, tpb, 128 pages, 2006)
Destruction's Daughter (collects #65–73, tpb, 224 pages, 2006)
Batman Allies Secret Files & Origins 2005: "Taking Sides" (with Tom Derenick, co-feature, 2005)
Catwoman vol. 3 #43: "Pest Control" (with Rick Burchett, 2005) collected in Catwoman: The One You Love (tpb, 240 pages, 2015)
Detective Comics #808–810: "The Beast Beneath" (with Tommy Castillo, co-feature, 2005) collected in Batman Arkham: Killer Croc (tpb, 296 pages, 2016)
Omega Men vol. 2 #1–6 (with Henry Flint, 2006–2007)
Vertigo Crime: Fogtown (with Brad Rader, graphic novel, hc, 176 pages, 2010, ; sc, 2011)

References

External links

American comics writers
American male film actors
American people of Danish descent
American gay actors
American gay writers
LGBT comics creators
Living people
Year of birth missing (living people)
21st-century LGBT people